McNelly is a surname. Notable people with the surname include:

 Jack McNelly (1949-2020), American curler and coach
 Leander H. McNelly (1844–1877), Confederate officer and Texas Ranger
 Nicki McNelly (born 1962), British Anglican priest
 Willis E. McNelly (1920–2003), American professor and writer

See also
 McNally (surname)